Gyula Bereznai (1 May 1921 – 6 September 1990) was a Hungarian mathematician and former head of department at a Teacher Training College in Nyíregyháza.

Biography
He was born in Sátoraljaújhely on 1 May 1921. He completed his elementary school in Tornyospálca, the secondary school in Kisvárda. His studies at the University of Debrecen were interrupted by the war (captivity). After six years in prison, he received a degree in mathematics from Eötvös Loránd University, Budapest. After the Nyíregyháza Vocational School and the Kölcsey Grammar School, he was admitted to the mathematics department of the Bessenyei György Teacher Training College in 1962. From 1969 to 1983 he was head of the department. For more than two decades he taught the future generation of teachers the basics of mathematical analysis, to whom he tried to pass on his knowledge and experience, and he was always happy to share it with his colleagues. Besides his professional security, he tried to shape his students with his own high standards. He was loved and respected by his colleagues and students, but the same can be said of mathematics teachers in the county, for whom he has organized and held numerous advanced lectures. He was not an ordinary individual, he was a true, well-educated teacher who was proficient not only in mathematics but also in physics, chemistry, and philosophy. His work is marked by numerous professional and methodological publications. He has written and edited several books and examples.

Work
His specialty was mathematical analysis. 
Former member of the editorial board of Teaching Mathematics.
The Mathematical Competition named after Gyula Bereznai has been held annually since 1991.

One of his students, who had good results in other subjects, asked, "Mr. professor, is it because I am weak in maths?
can I be a minister? "
Uncle Gyuszi didn't think twice about answering: "Sure, you can be a minister, why not?"

Awards
 1960 – János Bolyai Mathematical Society Emanuel Beke memorial prize

Books
 Pythagorean theorem
 History of numerals 
 Mathematics competitions for teacher training colleges

Notes

References

External links
Bereznai Gyula
Bereznai Gyula pedagogical prize
Books

1921 births
1990 deaths
20th-century Hungarian mathematicians
People from Sátoraljaújhely
People from Szabolcs-Szatmár-Bereg County
People from Nyíregyháza
Eötvös Loránd University alumni
University of Debrecen alumni
Hungarian prisoners of war